The 2016–17 UEFA Europa League knockout phase began on 16 February and ended on 24 May 2017 with the final at Friends Arena in Solna, Sweden, to decide the champions of the 2016–17 UEFA Europa League. A total of 32 teams competed in the knockout phase.

Times up to 25 March 2017 (round of 32 and round of 16) were CET (UTC+1), thereafter (quarter-finals and beyond) times were CEST (UTC+2).

Round and draw dates
The schedule of the competition is as follows (all draws were held at the UEFA headquarters in Nyon, Switzerland, unless stated otherwise).

Matches could also be played on Tuesdays or Wednesdays instead of the regular Thursdays due to scheduling conflicts.

Format
The knockout phase involves 32 teams: the 24 teams which qualified as winners and runners-up of each of the twelve groups in the group stage, and the eight third-placed teams from the Champions League group stage.

Each tie in the knockout phase, apart from the final, is played over two legs, with each team playing one leg at home. The team that scores more goals on aggregate over the two legs advance to the next round. If the aggregate score is level, the away goals rule is applied, i.e. the team that scored more goals away from home over the two legs advances. If away goals are also equal, then thirty minutes of extra time is played. The away goals rule is again applied after extra time, i.e. if there are goals scored during extra time and the aggregate score is still level, the visiting team advances by virtue of more away goals scored. If no goals are scored during extra time, the tie is decided by penalty shoot-out. In the final, which is played as a single match, if scores are level at the end of normal time, extra time is played, followed by penalty shoot-out if scores remain tied.

The mechanism of the draws for each round is as follows:
In the draw for the round of 32, the twelve group winners and the four third-placed teams from the Champions League group stage with the better group records are seeded, and the twelve group runners-up and the other four third-placed teams from the Champions League group stage are unseeded. The seeded teams are drawn against the unseeded teams, with the seeded teams hosting the second leg. Teams from the same group or the same association cannot be drawn against each other.
In the draws for the round of 16 onwards, there are no seedings, and teams from the same group or the same association can be drawn against each other.

On 17 July 2014, the UEFA emergency panel ruled that Ukrainian and Russian clubs would not be drawn against each other "until further notice" due to the political unrest between the countries.

Qualified teams

Europa League group stage winners and runners-up

Champions League group stage third-placed teams

Bracket

Round of 32
The draw was held on 12 December 2016. The first legs were played on 16 February, and the second legs were played on 22 and 23 February 2017.

Summary

|}

Matches

APOEL won 4–3 on aggregate.

Ajax won 1–0 on aggregate.

3–3 on aggregate. Anderlecht won on away goals.

Genk won 3–2 on aggregate.

Manchester United won 4–0 on aggregate.

Roma won 4–1 on aggregate.

Copenhagen won 2–1 on aggregate.

Celta Vigo won 2–1 on aggregate.

Olympiacos won 3–0 on aggregate.

Gent won 3–2 on aggregate.

Rostov won 5–1 on aggregate.

Krasnodar won 2–1 on aggregate.

Borussia Mönchengladbach won 4–3 on aggregate.

Lyon won 11–2 on aggregate.

Beşiktaş won 5–2 on aggregate.

Schalke 04 won 4–1 on aggregate.

Round of 16
The draw was held on 24 February 2017. The first legs were played on 9 March, and the second legs were played on 16 March 2017.

Summary

|}

Matches

Celta Vigo won 4–1 on aggregate.

Anderlecht won 2–0 on aggregate.

3–3 on aggregate. Schalke 04 won on away goals.

Lyon won 5–4 on aggregate.

Manchester United won 2–1 on aggregate.

Beşiktaş won 5–2 on aggregate.

Genk won 6–3 on aggregate.

Ajax won 3–2 on aggregate.

Quarter-finals
The draw was held on 17 March 2017. The first legs were played on 13 April, and the second legs were played on 20 April 2017.

Summary

|}

Matches

Manchester United won 3–2 on aggregate.

Celta Vigo won 4–3 on aggregate.

Ajax won 4–3 on aggregate.

3–3 on aggregate. Lyon won 7–6 on penalties.

Semi-finals
The draw was held on 21 April 2017. The first legs were played on 3 and 4 May, and the second legs were played on 11 May 2017.

Summary

|}

Matches

Ajax won 5–4 on aggregate.

Manchester United won 2–1 on aggregate.

Final

The final was played on 24 May 2017 at Friends Arena in Solna, Sweden. The "home" team (for administrative purposes) was determined by an additional draw held after the semi-final draw.

Notes

References

External links
2016–17 UEFA Europa League

3
UEFA Europa League knockout phases